HMS Cleopatra was a Royal Navy  screw corvette built in 1878.

Design
Planning for six metal-hulled corvettes began in 1876; these became the Comus-class corvettes and were designed for long voyages away from coaling stations. Given a metal hull, its frame was composed of iron or steel. Its hull had copper sheathing over timber beneath the waterline, but that timber simply served to separate the iron hull from the copper sheathing so as to prevent electrolytic corrosion. The timber extended to the upper deck; it was in two layers from the keel to 3 ft (.9 m) above the water line, and one layer above.

It was fitted with 3-cylinder compound engines with one high-pressure cylinder of  diameter being flanked by two low-pressure cylinders of  diameter. The bow above the waterline was nearly straight, in contrast to that of wooden sailing ships. It had stern galleries, similar to older frigates, but the ports were false, and there were no quarter galleries. Boats were carried both amidships and at the stern. Cleopatra flew a barque or ship rig of sail on three masts, including studding sails on fore and mainmasts.

Between its two complete decks was the open quarterdeck, on which the battery was located. Under the lower deck were spaces for water, provisions, coal, and magazines for shell and powder. Amidships were the engine and boiler rooms. These were covered by an armoured deck, 1.5 inches (38 mm) thick and approximately 100 ft (30 m) long. This armour was about 3 ft (90 cm) below the lower deck, and the space between could be used for additional coal bunkerage. The machinery spaces were flanked by coal bunkers, affording the machinery and magazines some protection from the sides. The lower deck was used for berthing of the ship's company; officers aft, warrant and petty officers forward, and ratings amidships, as was traditional. The tops of the coal bunkers, which projected above deck level, were used for seating at the mess tables. The living spaces were well-ventilated and an improvement over prior vessels.

Service history

On 18 December 1878, Cleopatra ran into the steamship Lord Gough in the Clyde, severely damaging her.

Cleopatra was used as a training cruiser in 1902, when she was under the command of Commander Charles Lionel Napier. She visited Jersey in June 1902, Guernsey two months later, then toured various parts of British waters until late September, with a break taking part in the Coronation Fleet review at Spithead on 16 August 1902. During late Autumn she visited the Spanish cities of Vigo and Málaga in early November 1902, then Gibraltar, the island of Madeira and the Spanish cities of Ferrol and Vilagarcía.

References

Bibliography

 
 
 

 

Comus-class corvettes
Ships built on the River Clyde
1878 ships
Victorian-era corvettes of the United Kingdom
Maritime incidents in December 1878